Panlong (lit. "coiled dragon") is an aquatic dragon resembling a jiaolong 蛟龍 "river dragon; crocodile" in Chinese mythology, an ancient motif in Chinese art, and a proper name.

Word
The Chinese compound panlong combines pan  "coiling; curling; curving; bending; winding; twisting" and long  or  "dragon". Longpan  "dragon coiling", the reverse of panlong, is a literary metaphor for "person of unrecognized talent" (see the Fayan below).

Another example of this graphic interchangeability is panrao  or  "twine round; surround; fill". Two Classical Chinese panlong  idioms are panlongpi  ("coiling dragon habit") "gambling addiction" (alluding to 5th-century gambler Liu Yi  or Liu Panlong  of Eastern Jin ) and panlong-wohu  (lit. "coiling dragon crouching tiger") "talented people remaining concealed". In Fengshui and Four Symbols theory, the Dragon and Tiger are symbolic opposites. Take for instance, longtan-huxue  ("dragon's pond and tiger's cave") "dangerous places" or Wohu canglong  Crouching Tiger, Hidden Dragon.

Textual usages

Chinese classic texts began using panlong in the Han Dynasty (206 BCE – 220 CE). The (2nd century BCE) Huainanzi (8, tr. Morgan 1934:95) first records panlong as a decorative style on Chinese bronzes. 
Great bells and tripods, beautiful vessels, works of art are manufactured. The decorations cast on these have been superb. The mountain dragon, or pheasant, and all animals of variegated plumage, the aquatic grass, flamboyants and grains of cereals were engraven on them, one symbol interwoven with another. The sleeping rhinoceros and crouching tiger, the dragon, wreathed in coils, were wrought. 
The later term panlongwen  "coiled-dragon pattern/design (on bronzes, pillars, etc.)" compares with panchiwen  (see chilong ) and panqiuwen  (see qiulong ). Another Huainanzi context (15, tr. Morgan 1934:199) lists longshepan  (lit. "dragon snake coiling") "serpentine passage" as a good ambush location. 
An exiguous pass, a ferry pontoon, a great mountain, a serpentine defile, a cul-de-sac, a dangerous pitfall, a narrow ravine, full of winding ways like the intestines of a sheep, a hole like a fisher's net, which admits, but from which there is no exit, are situations in which one man can hold back a thousand. 

The materialist philosopher Yang Xiong (53 BCE – 18 CE) used both panlong and longpan. His Fangyan  "Regional Speech" dictionary (12, tr. Visser 1913:73) defined panlong  "coiled/curled dragon", "Dragons which do not yet ascend to heaven [cf. tianlong "heavenly dragon"] are called p'an-lung." His Fayan  "Words to Live By" anthology (4, tr. Carr 1990:112) coined the metaphor longpan  (lit. "dragon coiling")  "person of unrecognized talent", "'a dragon coiled in the mud will be insulted by a newt,' meaning 'a sage will be ridiculed by a fool'." 

The (2nd century CE) Shangshu dazhuan  commentary to the Classic of History (1, tr. Carr 1990:113) parallels panlong and jiaoyu  (or jiaolong ), "the  'coiled dragon' was greatly trusted in its lair, the  ' dragon; crocodile' leaped in its pool." 

The (12th century CE) Song Dynasty Biji manzhi  "Random Jottings from the Green Rooster Quarter" by Wang Zhuo  (tr. Visser 1913:117) describes using panlong dragons in sympathetic magic for rainfall, "where a mirror, adorned on the backside with a "coiled dragon", p'an lung, is said to have been worshipped (rather used in a magical way) in order to cause rain."

Proper names

In addition to the ancient decorative style mentioned above, Panlong  or  "Coiled Dragon" is used in several names. 

The Japanese language borrowed banryū  or  "coiled dragon" as a loanword from Chinese panlong. Banryu names a Taikyoku shogi chess-piece and a Bakufu schooner warship Banryū.

References
Carr, Michael. 1990. "Chinese Dragon Names", Linguistics of the Tibeto-Burman Area 13.2:87–189.
Morgan, Evan S, tr. 1934. Tao, the Great Luminant: Essays from the Huai Nan Tzu. Kelly and Walsh.
Visser, Marinus Willern de. 1913. The Dragon in China and Japan . J. Müller.

External links
P'an Basin with Dragon Motif , Shang Dynasty, National Palace Museum
, Qing Dynasty agate bottle with coiled-dragon pattern 

Chinese dragons

fr:Dragon oriental#Variétés